Francesco Aldi (born 17 September 1981 in Palermo, Italy) is a former Italian professional tennis player.

References

External links
 

Italian male tennis players
Living people
1981 births
21st-century Italian people